Abel Stevens (1815–1897) was an American clergyman, editor, and author known for his books on Methodist religious history. He wrote History of the Methodist Episcopal Church in the United States of America, an early history of the church that is frequently referenced in historical works, and A Compendious History of American Methodism.

Selected publications
Memorials of the introduction of Methodism into the eastern states: comprising biographical notices of its early preachers, sketches of its first churches, and reminiscences of its early struggles and successes. Boston, C. H. Pierce [etc.]; New York, Lane & Tippett; [etc., etc.] 1848
Sketches & incidents. New York, Lane & Scott, 1848 (edited by George Peck; also attributed to Abel Stevens)
Remarkable examples of moral recovery showing the power of religion in extreme cases ... New York, Carlton & Phillips, 1854
History of the religious movement of the eighteenth century, called Methodism, considered in its different denominational forms, and its relations to British and American Protestantism. New York, Carlton & Porter; London, A. Heylin [1858-61]
Life and times of Nathan Bangs, D. D. New York, Carlton & Porter 1863
Women of Methodism; its three foundresses, Susanna Wesley, the Countess of Huntingdon, and Barbara Heck; with sketches of their female associates and successors in the early history of the denomination. New York, Carlton & Porter, 1866
Madame de Staël, a study of her life and times : the first revolution and the first empire. New York : Harper & Brothers, 1880

References

External links

1815 births
1897 deaths
19th-century Methodist ministers
American Christian writers
Arminian ministers
Arminian writers
Methodist ministers